The Haggada of the Jewish Idea, or Haggadah of the Jewish Idea  (Haggadat HaRa'ayon) is a book written by Binyamin Ze'ev Kahane based on his commentary of the classic Passover Haggada, which is based on his father, Rabbi Meir Kahane's teachings of the "Jewish Idea". The book's commentary focuses on the "Jewish Idea" in general, particularly the concept of faith in God. It also focuses on the approach to Passover, and the nighttime Seder which would, "define the faith of the Jew."

About Book
The text of the book is presented in Hebrew with an English translation on the facing page. The majority of the Hebrew version's commentary, which is presented in English, is taken from Rabbi Meir Kahane's four-volume Tanakh commentary, Perush HaMacabee. Volume 1, on Exodus (covering Exodus 1:1-3:16), was later (in 2015) translated into English by Daniel Pinner. The other three volumes have never been translated into English. The book's commentary is differentiated from the main text by being on a grayish background. The book also contains footnotes, in English, at the bottom  of the appropriate pages. Illustrations are spread throughout the text. The book also contains a glossary, that includes biographical information about many of the leaders mentioned, which can be found at the end of the book.

Publishing
The book was republished by the HaRaayon HaYehudi (Yeshiva of the Jewish Idea) in 1997.
The book was again republished and reprinted by HaMeir L'David on March 27, 2003. It was translated by Daniel Pinner, and edited by Lenny Goldberg, author of The Wit and Wisdom of Rabbi Meir Kahane. It was illustrated by Avinadav Vitkin.

There is an English edition, as well as a Hebrew edition.

See also
 Binyamin Ze'ev Kahane
 Meir Kahane
 Kahanism

References

External links
 Review by Tzvi Fishman
 Review by Rochelle Caviness
 Video of Lenny Goldberg (editor) and Daniel Pinner (translator) speaking about the English version of the book at an event at the Orthodox Union (OU) Israel center in Jerusalem]

Kahanism
Books about Judaism
 
Passover seder
Meir Kahane